Maryse Warda (born 1961) is an Egyptian Canadian translator. She primarily translates English plays of Canadian origin into French. Her work is described as being "faithful to the original with an unostentatious use of Quebec idiom".

Biography 

Warda was born in Cairo, Egypt, but immigrated to Montréal, Quebec, Canada with her parents at the age of 9. She first learned English from watching Happy Days on television. She graduated from the Université de Montréal with a degree in English literature. At the time, she did not intend to pursue a career in translation. In 1991, she began working as an assistant at the Théâtre de Quat’Sous under Pierre Bernard. Bernard persuaded her to translate her first play, Brilliant Traces by Cindy Lou Johnson. This was a success, earning her a Prix de la critique nomination from the Association québécoise des critiques de théâtre. She went on to translate several other plays during her tenure, such as Cindy Lou Johnson’s The Years (Les années), Brad Fraser’s The Ugly Man (L'homme laid), and Philip Ridley’s Pitchfork Disney.  She left the Théâtre de Quat'Sous in 2001. In 2002, she began working for the National Theatre School of Canada, holding the position of associate director general.

Warda was nominated for the Governor General’s Award in 2001 for her translation of George F. Walker’s Suburban Motel as Motel de passage, and later won a Governor General’s Award in 2011 for her translation of Greg MacArthur’s The Toxic Bus Incident as Toxique ou l’incident dans l’autobus. Warda later stated that she had never expected to win, as she had not expected a play to be chosen for the award.

In 2015, Warda’s translation into French of Erin Shields’ If We Were Birds was used in a production of the play directed by Geneviève L. Blais.

Warda lives in the Plateau-Mont-Royal borough of Montreal with her husband, actor Benoît Gouin.

Awards and nominations 
 2011 Governor General's Award for a French Language Translation (won) – Toxique ou l'incident dans l'autobus (2011)
 2006 Masque de la Traduction – Wit (2006)
 2001 Masque de la Traduction (won) – Motel de passage (2001)
 2001 Governor General's Award for a French Language Translation – Motel de passage (2001)
 1996 Masque de la Traduction – Variations sur un temps (1996)
 1992 Prix de la critique, Meilleur traduction – Traces d'étoiles (1992)

Selected works 
Translated plays
 Traces d’étoiles (1992) – written by Cindy Lou Johnson, directed by Pierre Bernard. First produced by Théâtre de Quat’Sous.
 L'homme laid (1993) – written by Brad Fraser, directed by Pierre Bernard. First produced by Théâtre de Quat'Sous.
 Pitchfork Disney (1994) – written by Philip Ridley, directed by Marie-Louise Leblanc. First produced by Théâtre de Quat'Sous.
 Les années (1995) – written by Cindy Lou Johnson, directed by Pierre Bernard. First produced by Théâtre de Quat'Sous.
 Variations sur un temps (1996) – written by David Ives, directed by Pierre Bernard. First produced by Théâtre de Quat’Sous.
 Le cryptogramme (1996) – written by David Mamet, directed by Denise Guilbault. First produced by Théâtre de Quat'Sous.
 Motel de passage  (1998–1999) – written by George F. Walker, directed by Pierre Bernard, Denise Guilbault, and Denis Bernard. First produced by Théâtre de Quat’Sous.
 La chambre bleue (2001) – written by David Hare, directed by Serge Denoncourt. First produced by Théâtre du Rideau Vert.
 Une si belle chose (2001) – written by Jonathan Harvey, directed by Eric Dean. First produced by Théâtre du Rideau Vert.
 Comme en Alaska (2005) – written by Harold Pinter, directed by Estelle Clareton. First produced by Théâtre de Quat'Sous.
 Wit (2006) – written by Margaret Edson, directed by Denise Guilbault. First produced by Théâtre de Quat'Sous.
 Les mondes possibles (2008) – written by John Mighton, directed by Arianna Bardesono. First produced by Théâtre de Quat'Sous.
 Yellow Moon (2010) – written by David Greig, directed by Sylvain Bélanger. First produced by La Manufacture
 Anna sous les tropiques (2011) – written by Nilo Cruz, directed by Jean Leclerc. First produced by Théâtre de Rideau Vert
 Vigile (ou Le veilleur) (2012) – written by Morris Panych, directed by Martin Faucher. First produced by Théâtre de Rideau Vert
 L'éclipse (2012) – written by Joyce Carol Oates, directed by Carmen Jolin. First produced by Théâtre Prospero
 Ce moment-là (2012) – written by Deirdre Kinahan, directed by Denis Bernard. First produced by La Manufacture.
 Du bon monde (2012) – written by David Lindsay-Abaire, directed by Pierre Bernard. FIrst produced by Théâtre Jean-Duceppe
 La Vénus au vison (2013) – written by David Ives, directed by Michel Poirier. First produced by Théâtre Jean-Duceppe.
 Peter et Alice (2014) – written by John Logan, directed by Hugo Bélanger. First produced by Théâtre Jean-Duceppe.
 Si les oiseaux (2015) – written by Erin Shields, directed by Geneviève L. Blais. First produced by Théâtre Prospero
Published translated plays
 Toxique (2011) – written by Greg MacArthur
 Traces d’étoiles (2011) – written by Cindy Lou Johnson
 Bye Bye Baby (2009) – written by Elyse Gasco
 Motel de passage, Tome 1 & 2 (2001–2002) – written by George F. Walker

References

External links 

 

Egyptian translators
21st-century Canadian translators
1961 births
Living people
Egyptian emigrants to Canada
Canadian women non-fiction writers
Governor General's Award-winning translators
21st-century Canadian women writers